Giorgio de Chirico: Argonaut of the Soul (or ) is a 2010 documentary film produced by EKPOL (Social Intervention and Culture Company of the Prefecture of Magnesia), co-written and directed by Giorgos Lagdaris and Kostas Anestis. The film attempts to poetically approach the mysterious characteristic of the paintings of Giorgio de Chirico.

Synopsis 
Through archival material, the documentary unfolds the artist's life and work from his birth in Volos until his death in Rome. De Chirico's relationship with his birthplace is highlighted and how his first experiences in Volos influenced his later artistic production and his artistic worldview, with the enigma at the centre of his quests. The documentary features distinguished art historians, critics and writers talking about his personality and work, such as Niki Loizidi, Nikos Daskalothanasis, Miltiadis Papanikolaou, Gerd Roos, Kostas Androulidakis, Militsa Karathanou, Kostas Komninos.

Cast 

 Niki Loizidi as herself 
 Miltiadis Papanikolaou as himself 
 Kostas Androulidakis as himself 
 Gerd Roos as himself 
 Nikos Daskalothanasis as himself 
 Militsa Karathanou as herself 
 Konstantinos Hronopoulos as Little Giorgio
 Kostas Komninos as the Painter (De Chirico)
 Hristos Giannakopoulos as the Teacher (Kostas Mavroidis)

Production 
The shooting of the film took place in Volos, Pelion, Athens, Nafplio and Rome, in 2008.

References

External links 
 

2010 documentary films
2010 films
Greek documentary films
Documentary films about painters
Films shot in Greece
Films shot in Thessaly
Films shot in Rome
Giorgio de Chirico